Paederieae is a tribe of flowering plants in the family Rubiaceae and contains 81 species in 4 genera. Its representatives are found in the tropics and subtropics.

Genera 
Currently accepted names
 Leptodermis Wall. (46 sp)
 Paederia L. (33 sp)
 Serissa Comm. ex A.Juss. (1 sp)
 Spermadictyon Roxb. (1 sp)

Synonyms
 Buchozia L'Hér. ex Juss. = Serissa
 Daun-Contu Adans. = Paederia
 Democritea DC. = Serissa
 Disodea Pers. = Paederia
 Dysoda Lour. = Serissa
 Hamiltonia Roxb. = Spermadictyon
 Hondbesseion Kuntze = Paederia
 Hondbessen Adans. = Paederia
 Lecontea A.Rich. ex DC. = Paederia
 Lygodisodea Ruiz & Pav. = Paederia
 Reussia Dennst. = Paederia
 Siphomeris Bojer = Paederia

References 

Rubioideae tribes